Total Eclipse is a 1995 erotic historic drama film directed by Agnieszka Holland, based on a 1967 play by Christopher Hampton, who also wrote the screenplay. Based on letters and poems, it presents a historically accurate account of the passionate and violent relationship between 19th-century French poets Arthur Rimbaud (Leonardo DiCaprio) and Paul Verlaine (David Thewlis), at a time of soaring creativity for both men. Warner Bros. has included the film in the catalogue of Warner Archive Collection.

Plot

The older Paul Verlaine meets Arthur Rimbaud's sister, Isabelle, in a café in Paris. Isabelle and her mother want Verlaine to hand over any copies he may still have of Rimbaud's poems so that they can burn them; they fear the lewdness of his writings. Verlaine reflects on the wild relationship he formed with Rimbaud, beginning when the teenaged Rimbaud had sent his poetry to Verlaine from his home in the provinces in 1871. Verlaine, instantly fascinated, impulsively invites him to his rich father-in-law's home in Paris, where he lives with his young, pregnant wife. The wild, eccentric Rimbaud displays no sense of manners or decency whatsoever, scandalising Verlaine's pretentious, bourgeois in-laws.

The 27-year-old Verlaine is seduced by the 16-year-old Rimbaud's physical body as well as by the unique originality of his mind. The staid respectability of married, heterosexual life and easy, middle class surroundings had been stifling Verlaine's admittedly sybaritic literary talent. His taking up with Rimbaud is as much a rebellion and a liberation as it is a giving in to self-indulgence and masochism. Rimbaud acts as sadistically to Verlaine as does Verlaine to his young wife, whom he eventually deserts. A violent, itinerant relationship ensues between the two poets, the sad climax of which arrives in Brussels when a drunken and enraged Verlaine shoots and wounds Rimbaud and is sentenced a fine and two years in prison for sodomy and grievous bodily harm.

In prison, Verlaine converts to Christianity, to his erstwhile lover's disgust. Upon release he meets Rimbaud in Germany, vainly and mistakenly seeking to revive the relationship. The two men part, never to meet again. Bitterly renouncing literature in any form, Rimbaud travels the world alone, finally settling in Abyssinia (modern day Ethiopia) to run a "trading post". There he has a mistress and possibly a young boy-lover. A tumour in his right knee forces him back to France where his leg is amputated. Nevertheless, the cancer spreads and he dies at the age of 37. When he dies, the image of one of his most famous poems, Le Dormeur du val, appears.

During her conversation with Verlaine, Isabelle Rimbaud asserts that her brother had accepted confession from a priest right before he died, showing Christian penitence, which is why only the censored versions of his poetry should survive. Verlaine pretends to agree but tears up her card after she leaves. Later, Verlaine, drinking absinthe (to which he has become addicted), sees a vision of the sixteen-year-old Rimbaud, returned from some transcendent realm to express the love and respect Verlaine has thus posthumously earned. The film ends with the young Rimbaud walking alone on a mountain range, Verlaine proclaiming that they were both happy together, and Rimbaud claiming to have finally found eternity.

Cast

Critical response

Rotten Tomatoes gave the film a 22% "rotten" score with critics (four of the eighteen reviews being positive) against a 61% score with audiences. Metacritic gives the film a weighted average score of 42 out of 100 based on 17 critics, indicating "mixed or average reviews".

Home media
In 1999, a DVD edition of the film was released. It features both a widescreen and fullscreen version of the film on the same disc as well as the film trailer.

See also    
A Season in Hell (1971)
1995 in film
List of British films of 1995

References

External links
 
 

1995 films
1990s biographical drama films
1995 independent films
1995 LGBT-related films
American biographical drama films
American erotic drama films
American independent films
American LGBT-related films
Belgian biographical drama films
Belgian independent films
Belgian LGBT-related films
British biographical drama films
British independent films
British LGBT-related films
French biographical drama films
French independent films
French LGBT-related films
Italian biographical drama films
Italian independent films
Italian LGBT-related films
LGBT-related drama films
1990s English-language films
English-language Belgian films
English-language French films
English-language Italian films
Films about writers
Male bisexuality in film
Cultural depictions of Arthur Rimbaud
Films set in the 1870s
Films set in the 1890s
Films shot in Antwerp
Films directed by Agnieszka Holland
Films scored by Jan A. P. Kaczmarek
1990s erotic drama films
1995 drama films
Biographical films about poets
LGBT-related romantic drama films
1990s American films
1990s British films
1990s French films